The Calouste Gulbenkian Museum houses one of the world's most important private art collections. It includes works from Ancient Egypt to the early 20th century, spanning the arts of the Islamic World, China and Japan, as well as the French decorative arts, Impressionist painting and the jewellery of René Lalique.

Collection

The permanent exhibition and galleries are distributed chronologically and in geographical order to create two independent circuits within the overall tour.

The first circuit highlights Greco-Roman art from classical antiquity, as well as art from the ancient Near East and the Nile Valley. Among the artworks are ancient Egyptian, Mesopotamian, Persian, and Armenian pieces, as well as Persian art from the Islamic period.

The second circuit includes European art, with sections dedicated to the art of the book, sculpture, painting and the decorative arts, particularly 18th century French art and the work of René Lalique. In this circuit, a wide-ranging number of pieces reflect various European artistic trends from the beginning of the 11th century to the mid-20th century. The section begins with works in ivory and illuminated manuscript books, followed by a selection of 15th, 16th and 17th century sculptures and paintings. Renaissance art produced in the Netherlands, Flanders, France and Italy is on display in the next room.

French 18th century decorative art has a special place in the museum, with outstanding gold and silver objects and furniture, as well as paintings and sculptures. This section is followed by galleries exhibiting a large group of paintings by the Venetian Francesco Guardi, 18th and 19th century English paintings, and finally a superb collection of jewels and glass by René Lalique, displayed in its own room.

Some of the works in the collection were bought during the Soviet sale of Hermitage paintings. Of about 6000 items in the museum's collections, a selection of around 1000 is on permanent exhibition. Gulbenkian's motto was "only the best"; hence the museum has masterpieces by western European artists such as Domenico Ghirlandaio, Rubens, Rembrandt, Rodin, Carpeaux, Houdon, Renoir, Dierick Bouts, Vittore Carpaccio, Cima da Conegliano, Van Dyck, Corot, Degas, Nattier, George Romney, Stefan Lochner, Maurice-Quentin de La Tour, Édouard Manet, Henri Fantin-Latour, Claude Monet, Jean-François Millet, Sir Edward Burne-Jones, Thomas Gainsborough, Joseph Mallord William Turner, Jean-Honoré Fragonard, Giovanni Battista Moroni, Frans Hals, Ruisdael, Boucher, Largillière, Andrea della Robbia, Pisanello, Jean-Baptiste Pigalle, Antonio Rossellino, André-Charles Boulle
, Charles Cressent, Oeben, Riesener, Antoine-Sébastien Durand, Charles Spire, Jean Deforges, François-Thomas Germain.

History

Vasco Maria Eugénio de Almeida acquired part of the Parque de Santa Gertrudes, in April 1957, for the construction of the Foundation buildings and public/private park. Two years later, a competition was launched for a project to construct the organization's headquarters.  It was eventually won by the team that included architects Alberto J. Pessoa, Pedro Cid and Ruy Jervis d'Athouguia (1917-2006), in addition to the landscaping architects António Viana Barreto and Gonçalo Ribeiro Telles, who were responsible for designing the park surrounding the building. Later, Francisco Caetano Keil do Amaral was added to the team, as a consultant, and Frederico Henrique George joined the team working on the building.

In December 1961, the anterior project of the park was begun, while work on the earthworks and retaining walls beginning the following year. A sculpture panel was installed in the headquarters building by architect Artur Rosa in 1962. By 1967, the interior finishing were adjudicated, with the project concluded in 1968. On 2 October 1969, the buildings and gardens were inaugurated.

The 12th International Federation of Landscaping Architects Congress was held in September 1970 on the grounds of the Gulbenkian Foundation. In 1975, the property was distinguished with the Valmor Prize.

Architecture
The museum was designed as a showcase for the collection, which was relatively unique for an art museum at a time when most museums were housed in buildings originally built for other purposes.  The landscaping and museum building interact, with views into woods and wetlands punctuating the artwork on display, while woodland paths offer views of the dramatic building, the edges of which include terraces and water features that blur the border between built and natural environment. The grouped buildings are set within a park bordered by the Avenida de Berna (north), Avenida António Augusto de Aguiar (west), Rua Marquês de Sá da Bandeira (east) and the Centro de Arte Moderna (south).

The shape of the museum and headquarters is relatively simple, with wings "T"-shaped wings, each with an entrance. The massive volume, long and horizontal was used for administration, services and as auditoriums, off of the main, single entry space. It is in this entrance that the panel Começar, by Almada Negreiros is situated.

References

Notes

Sources

See also 
 Calouste Gulbenkian Foundation
 Centro de Arte Moderna Gulbenkian

External links
Virtual tour of the Calouste Gulbenkian Museum provided by Google Arts & Culture

Art museums and galleries in Portugal
Museums in Lisbon
Biographical museums in Portugal
Former private collections
Sculpture gardens, trails and parks in Europe
Buildings and structures in Lisbon District
Brutalist architecture in Portugal
Egyptological collections
Calouste Gulbenkian Foundation
National monuments in Lisbon District
Numismatic museums
National monuments in Portugal
Ancient art on Alexander the Great
Decorative arts museums
Textile museums
Asian art museums in Portugal